The 1989 Svenska Cupen final took place on 29 June 1989 at Råsunda in Solna. The match was contested by Allsvenskan sides Malmö FF and Djurgårdens IF. Djurgården played their first final since 1975 and their third final in total, Malmö FF played their first final since 1986 and their 16th final in total. Malmö FF won their 14th title with a 3–0 victory.

Match details

External links
Svenska Cupen at svenskfotboll.se

1989
Cupen
Malmö FF matches
Djurgårdens IF Fotboll matches
June 1989 sports events in Europe